The Graham Gymnasium is a historic building on the campus of Western New Mexico University in Silver City, New Mexico. It was built in 1936, making it one of the last buildings of the original campus completed. An extension was built in 1977–1978. The original building was designed in the Mission Revival style by architect John Gaw Meem, with a Zia sun symbol. It has been listed on the National Register of Historic Places since September 22, 1988.

References

Gyms in the United States
National Register of Historic Places in Grant County, New Mexico
Mission Revival architecture in New Mexico
School buildings completed in 1936
School buildings on the National Register of Historic Places in New Mexico
Western New Mexico University
1936 establishments in New Mexico